Ari Wegner, (born 3 May 1984) is an Australian cinematographer. Her work includes films such as Lady Macbeth (2016), True History of the Kelly Gang (2019), and Zola (2020). In 2021, she served as cinematographer on The Power of the Dog for which she received widespread critical acclaim including an Academy Award nomination for Best Cinematography, becoming only the second woman to do so in the award's 94-year history.

Career
Wegner studied film at the Victorian College of the Arts, later working as cinematographer in several short films and commercials. In 2016, she worked in the thriller drama series The Kettering Incident, receiving a nomination for Best Cinematography in Television at the 6th AACTA Awards. The same year, she was the director of photography in William Oldroyd's debut film Lady Macbeth, based on the novella Lady Macbeth of the Mtsensk District. For the film, she won the British Independent Film Award for Best Cinematography.

In 2017, she worked in the drama serial Guerrilla and the second season of the anthology series The Girlfriend Experience. In 2018, she worked in the horror comedy In Fabric, receiving a second nomination for the British Independent Film Awards. In 2020, she worked in the black comedy Zola, for the film she was nominated for Best Cinematography at the 37th Independent Spirit Awards.

In 2021, she worked in Jane Campion's western drama The Power of the Dog, the film received critical acclaim and Wegner has received several awards and nominations for her work as cinematographer.

She was the recipient of the Variety Artisan Award at the 2021 Toronto International Film Festival's TIFF Tribute Awards ceremony.

Filmography
Film

Television

Awards and nominations

References

External links

Australian cinematographers
Australian women cinematographers
1984 births
Living people